Araure is a town in the Venezuelan state of Portuguesa.  This town is the seat of the Araure Municipality and, according to the 2001 Venezuelan census, the municipality has a population of 111,908.

History
Araure was founded on July 6, 1694, as Nuestra Señora del Pilar de Araure.

Demographics
The Araure Municipality, according to the 2001 Venezuelan census, has a population of 111,908 (up from 75,811 in 1990). This amounts to 15.4% of Portuguesa's population.

Government
Araure is the seat of the Araure Municipality in Portuguesa.  The mayor is José Rafael Vásquez, elected in 2004 with 44% of the vote.  He replaced Armando Rodriguez shortly after the last municipal elections in October 2004.

References

External links
araure-portuguesa.gob.ve 
Information on the Araure Municipality 

Cities in Portuguesa (state)
Populated places established in 1694
1694 establishments in the Spanish Empire